Eales is a surname. Notable people with the surname include:

 Darren Eales (born 1971), retired English footballer
 Geoff Eales, Welsh jazz pianist
 Jacqueline Eales, British professor of early modern history
 John Eales (born 1970), Australian former rugby union player
 Paul Eales (born 1963), English professional golfer

See also
 Eales disease
 John Eales Medal
 Mrs. Mary Eales's Receipts